Anatoli Valeryevich Vanzhula (born 29 June 1975) is a Russian former professional footballer.

Club career
He made his debut in the Russian Premier League in 1999 for FC Chernomorets Novorossiysk.

External links
  Profile at Footballfacts

1975 births
Sportspeople from Taganrog
Living people
Russian footballers
Association football midfielders
Russian expatriate footballers
Expatriate footballers in Belarus
Expatriate footballers in Kazakhstan
Russian Premier League players
FC Taganrog players
FC Sokol Saratov players
FC Metallurg Lipetsk players
FC Chernomorets Novorossiysk players
FC Caspiy players
FC Sodovik Sterlitamak players
FC Torpedo Minsk players
FC Sakhalin Yuzhno-Sakhalinsk players
FC Nosta Novotroitsk players
FC Volga Ulyanovsk players